Nick Fozzard (born 22 July 1977) is an English former professional rugby league footballer who played as a  or  forward in the 1990s, 2000s and 2010s. He played at representative level for Great Britain and Yorkshire, and at club level for the Leeds Rhinos, Huddersfield Giants, Warrington Wolves, St Helens (Heritage № 1134), Hull Kingston Rovers, Castleford Tigers (Heritage № 916), and in the Championship for the Dewsbury Rams.

Career

Born in Wakefield, West Yorkshire, England, Fozzard started his career with Leeds, and went on to play for Huddersfield Giants and Warrington Wolves before joining St Helens in 2004.

As 2006 Super League champions, St Helens faced 2006 NRL Premiers the Brisbane Broncos in the 2007 World Club Challenge. He was selected in the 2007 Super League Dream Team. 
During his spell with St. Helens he won numerous honours, including the World Club Challenge and the Challenge Cup. He also played in 2008's Super League XIII Grand Final defeat by the Leeds Rhinos.

On 19 September 2008 Fozzard signed for Hull Kingston Rovers for the 2009 Super League campaign.

It was confirmed on 20 September 2009, that Fozzard would return to St. Helens after being released by Hull Kingston Rovers on the final year of his contract. Following a poor start to the 2010 season, Fozzard was dropped by coach Mick Potter.

Fozzard joined Castleford Tigers on a one-year deal on 16 September 2010. He retired in 2012 due to a serious shoulder injury.

References

External links
!Great Britain Statistics at englandrl.co.uk (statistics currently missing due to not having appeared for both Great Britain, and England)
St Helens profile
Profile at saints.org.uk
No fear of Kiwi pack says Fozzard
Fozzard signs for Saints
St Helens 75–0 Wigan
St Helens 30–16 Hull
Nick Fozzard Memory Box Search at archive.castigersheritage.com

1977 births
Living people
Castleford Tigers players
Dewsbury Rams players
English people of Italian descent
English rugby league players
Great Britain national rugby league team players
Huddersfield Giants players
Hull Kingston Rovers players
Leeds Rhinos players
Rugby league props
Rugby league second-rows
Rugby league players from Wakefield
St Helens R.F.C. players
Warrington Wolves players
Yorkshire rugby league team players